Many a Slip is a 1931 American pre-Code comedy film directed by Vin Moore and written by Edith Fitzgerald, Robert Riskin and Gladys Buchanan Unger. The film stars Joan Bennett, Lew Ayres, Slim Summerville, Ben Alexander, Virginia Sale and Roscoe Karns. The film was released in August 1931 by Universal Pictures.

Cast 
Joan Bennett as Pat Coster
Lew Ayres as Jerry Brooks
Slim Summerville as Hopkins
Ben Alexander as Ted Coster
Virginia Sale as Smitty
Roscoe Karns as Stan Price
Vivien Oakland as Emily Coster
J. C. Nugent as William Coster

References

External links 
 

1931 films
American comedy films
1931 comedy films
Universal Pictures films
Films directed by Vin Moore
American black-and-white films
1930s English-language films
1930s American films